The 1961 Lafayette Leopards football team was an American football team that represented Lafayette College during the 1961 NCAA College Division football season. Lafayette finished second-to-last in the Middle Atlantic Conference, University Division, and last in the Middle Three Conference.

In their fourth year under head coach James McConlogue, the Leopards compiled a 2–6–1 record. Walter Doleschal and Peter Lehr were the team captains.

In conference play, Lafayette went 1–5–1 against University Division opponents, for the division's seventh-best win percentage. The Leopards were swept by their Middle Three rivals, losing to both Lehigh and Rutgers.

Lafayette played its home games at Fisher Field on College Hill in Easton, Pennsylvania.

Schedule

References

Lafayette
Lafayette
Lafayette Leopards football seasons
Lafayette Leopards football